Lowell Observatory is an astronomical observatory in Flagstaff, Arizona, United States. Lowell Observatory was established in 1894, placing it among the oldest observatories in the United States, and was designated a National Historic Landmark in 1965. In 2011, the Observatory was named one of "The World's 100 Most Important Places" by Time Magazine. It was at the Lowell Observatory that the dwarf planet Pluto was discovered in 1930 by Clyde Tombaugh.

The observatory was founded by astronomer Percival Lowell of Boston's Lowell family and is overseen by a sole trustee, a position historically handed down through the family. The first trustee was Lowell's third cousin Guy Lowell (1916–1927). Percival's nephew Roger Putnam served from 1927 to 1967, followed by Roger's son Michael (1967–1987), Michael's brother William Lowell Putnam III (1987–2013), and current trustee W. Lowell Putnam.

Multiple astronauts attended the Lowell Observatory in 1963 while the moon was being mapped for the Apollo Program.

The observatory operates several telescopes at three locations in the Flagstaff area. The main facility, located on Mars Hill just west of downtown Flagstaff, houses the original  Clark Refracting Telescope, which is now used for public education, with 85,000 annual visitors. The telescope, built in 1896 for $20,000, was assembled in Boston by Alvan Clark & Sons and then shipped by train to Flagstaff. Also located on the Mars Hill campus is the  Pluto Discovery Telescope, used by Clyde Tombaugh in 1930 to discover the dwarf planet Pluto.

In 2014, the  Putnam Center was opened. This observatory included many rooms with tools that were useful to observers including a library for research, a room for processing photographic glass plates, multiple antique instruments used by previous astronomers, and many artifacts. The observatory does contain areas that are closed to the public view, although there are multiple places that tourists are welcome to visit.

Lowell is a partner with the United States Naval Observatory and Naval Research Laboratory in the Navy Precision Optical Interferometer (NPOI) also located at that site. The Observatory also operates smaller research telescopes at its historic site on Mars Hill and in Australia and Chile.

Past Anderson Mesa, on the peak of Happy Jack, Lowell Observatory built the  Lowell Discovery Telescope in partnership with Discovery Communications, Inc.

History

The observatory has carried out a wide array of research. One of its programs was the measurement of the variability of solar irradiance. When Harold L. Johnson took over as the director in 1952, the stated objective became to focus on light from the Sun reflecting from Uranus and Neptune. In 1953, the current  telescope was erected. Beginning in 1954, this telescope began monitoring the brightness of these two planets, and comparing these measurements with a reference set of Sun-like stars.

Self-taught astronomer Robert Burnham Jr. was an employee at Lowell observatory from 1958 – 1979, being known for his Celestial Handbook.

Beginning in 2012, Lowell Observatory began offering camps for children known as LOCKs (Lowell Observatory Camps for Kids). The first camp was established for elementary students. Later on, in 2013, they added an additional camp program for preschool children. The following year they added another program for middle school students. (“Kelly”, Manager at Lowell Observatory). Kids have the opportunity to learn hands-on about science, technology, engineering, and math (STEM) through a variety of activities that include games, experiments, story time, art, music, and more.

In 2016, Kevin Schindler published Lowell Observatory, a 128-page book containing over 200 captions and pictures. Arcadia Publishing’s Images of America included it in their series, which increased the enthusiasm of space in the public. The book itself features the popular reputation of Lowell Observatory, encompassing the revolutionary research of scientists and how they contributed to the field of astronomy.

Exhibits 
 The Rotunda Museum: Built in 1916, it is used by the observatory as a library and collection area for artifacts. It features displays that discuss the Lowell family history and the discoveries made at the observatory. It also houses many different measuring tools including Thatcher’s Calculating Instrument.
 Putnam Collection Center/ Lowell’s Lunar Legacy: When the Rotunda Museum is closed, the Putnam Collection Center and Lowell’s Lunar Legacy, are open to the public. The Center highlights the Observatories history and features artifacts from Lowell’s past and other scientific discoveries.
 The Giovale Open Deck Observatory: It is the newest addition to the Lowell observatory that allows guests to learn astronomy during the day and night. It features six telescopes, six plinths on the deck’s circumference, and an APS spectrum display. The six telescopes on the deck are a 5.5-inch TEC wide-field refractor, an 8-inch Moonraker Victorian refractor, a 32-inch Starstructure Dobsonian reflector, a 16-inch Meade ACF catadioptric reflector, a 17-inch PlaneWave CDK catadioptric reflector, and a 14-inch PlaneWave CDK catadioptric reflector.

Lowell Discovery Telescope 

Lowell Observatory owns and operates the Lowell Discovery Telescope (LDT, formerly the Discovery Channel Telescope) located near Happy Jack, Arizona. This 4.3-meter reflecting telescope is the fifth-largest telescope in the contiguous United States and one of the most powerful in the world, thanks to a unique housing that can accommodate up to five instruments at the Ritchey-Chrétien focus. The LDT can switch between any of these instruments in about a minute, making it uniquely suited for time-domain programs as well as opportunity targets such as gamma ray bursts and supernovae.

This finely figured, thin meniscus mirror, held in shape by a 156-element active optics system, regularly delivers sub-arcsecond seeing. The mirror was ground and polished into its hyperbolic shape at the Optical Fabrication and Engineering Facility of the College of Optical Sciences of the University of Arizona in Tucson.

Groundbreaking for the facility occurred on July 11, 2005. A little over six years later, the first image from just the primary mirror was recorded, using a small test camera mounted where the secondary mirror would eventually go. The secondary mirror was installed in January 2012. To celebrate first light, Lowell hosted a gala celebration on July 21, 2012, featuring a keynote address by Neil Armstrong. This was his final public appearance before his death several weeks later.

The telescope is named for the Discovery Channel television network. Discovery founder and CEO John Hendricks has long been a member of Lowell Observatory’s Advisory Board, and Discovery and John and his wife Maureen made gifts of $16 million toward the $53 million cost of the project. These were gifts, not purchases: Discovery has no ownership in the telescope, nor any direction of the research conducted with it. In return for their contributions, they received naming rights and first right of refusal for use of images in educational broadcasts. Research use proceeds as it would at any other professional telescope.

Boston University, the University of Maryland, the University of Toledo, Northern Arizona University, and Yale University have joined Lowell as partners with access to DCT.

Current research 
Lowell Observatory's astronomers conduct research on a wide range of solar system and astrophysical topics using ground-based, airborne, and space-based telescopes. Among the many current programs are a search for near-Earth asteroids, a survey of the Kuiper Belt beyond Neptune, a search for extrasolar planets, a decades-long study of the brightness stability of the sun, and a variety of investigations of star formation and other processes in distant galaxies. In addition, the Observatory staff designs and builds custom instrumentation for use on Lowell's telescopes and elsewhere. For example, Lowell staff built a sophisticated high-speed camera for use on the Stratospheric Observatory for Infrared Astronomy (SOFIA). SOFIA is a joint project of NASA and DLR, the German space agency, and consists of a  telescope on board a Boeing 747 SP.

Discoveries 

 The dwarf planet Pluto by Clyde Tombaugh in 1930
 Large recessional velocities of galaxies by Vesto Melvin Slipher between 1912 and 1914 (that led ultimately to the realization our universe is expanding)
 Co-discovery of the rings of Uranus in 1977
 The periodic variation in the activity of Comet Halley during the 1985/1986 apparition
 The three largest known stars
 The atmosphere of Pluto
 Accurate orbits for two of Pluto's moons: Nix and Hydra
 Oxygen on Jupiter's satellite Ganymede
 Carbon dioxide ice on three Uranian satellites
 The first Trojan of Neptune
 Evidence that the atmosphere of HD 209458 b contains water vapor

See also
 List of astronomical observatories
 List of largest optical telescopes in the continental United States

References 
Footnotes

 Sources
 
 Strauss, David (2001), Percival Lowell: The Culture and Science of a Boston Brahmin, Cambridge: Harvard University Press, 
 Hoyt, William Graves (1996), Lowell and Mars, Tucson: University of Arizona Press, 
 Putnam, William Lowell (1994), The Explorers of Mars Hill: A Centennial History of Lowell Observatory, 1894–1994, New Hampshire: Phoenix Publishing,

External links 

 Lowell Observatory
 Lowell Observatory Camps for Kids
 
 Lowell Discovery Telescope
 Flagstaff Clear Sky Clock Forecasts of observing conditions covering Lowell Observatory.
 National Historic Landmarks Program: Lowell Observatory

Historic American Buildings Survey (photographic survey)
 
 
 
 
 
 
 

Astronomical observatories in Arizona
National Register of Historic Places in Flagstaff, Arizona
National Historic Landmarks in Arizona
Buildings and structures on the National Register of Historic Places in Arizona
1894 establishments in Arizona Territory
Historic American Buildings Survey in Arizona